Medio (Spanish for "half") may refer to:

 Mediopassive voice in grammar
 Dolores Medio, a Spanish writer
 Medio Creek in Texas
 Arroyo del Medio in Argentina
 Medio, a company
 Medio, any of various halfpieces of currency across Latin America, especially
 Any of several half-real coins
 Any of several 5 centavo coins, approximating the notional amount of half a ⅛-peso real following decimalization

See also
 Media (disambiguation)
 Medium (disambiguation)